Marie Claire is a women's fashion magazine published by Hearst Magazines. A famous woman, typically an actress, singer, or model, is featured on the cover of each month's issue.

2010

2011

2012

2013

2014

2015

2016

2017

2018

2019

2020

See also
List of Marie Claire Australia cover models
Marie Claire
Marie Claire
Magazines published in the United States